Jack Meuleman (17 January 1894 – 16 December 1964) was an Australian rules footballer who played with Footscray in the Victorian Football Association (VFA) and Victorian Football League (VFL). His son Ken Meuleman went on to play  cricket for Australia, and both his grandson Robert Meuleman and great grandson Scott Meuleman played first class cricket for Western Australia.

Notes

External links 

1894 births
1964 deaths
Australian rules footballers from Victoria (Australia)
Western Bulldogs players
Footscray Football Club (VFA) players